The Best of the Stony Plain Years is a compilation album by Long John Baldry. Released on 17 June 2014 in North America, and the rest of the world on 23 June, it collects LJB's best work with the Stony Plain Records label. The album features a previously unreleased live version of "Dimples" and other rarities.

Track listing
"Good Morning Blues" – 3:48 (From Remembering Leadbelly, recorded in 1958 & 2001)
"I'm Shakin'" – 3:48 (From Right to Sing the Blues, recorded in 1996)
"Easy Street" – 3:49 (From Right to Sing the Blues, recorded in 1996)
"Midnight Special" – 3:22 (From Remembering Leadbelly, recorded in 2001)
"Gallows Pole" – 2:44 (From Remembering Leadbelly, recorded in 2001)
"Midnight Hour Blues" – 3:58 (From Right to Sing the Blues, recorded in 1996)
"Dimples" – 3:58 (Previously unreleased, recorded in 1988)
"Insane Asylum" – 5:24 (From It Still Ain't Easy, recorded in 1991)
"Midnight In New Orleans" – 3:23 (From It Still Ain't Easy, recorded in 1991)
"Black Girl" – 3:01 (From Stony Plain: Absolute Blues 2, recorded in 1996)
"Time's Gettin' Tougher Than Tough" – 6:53 (From Jimmy Witherspoon with the Duke Robillard Band, recorded in 1995)

Personnel

Long John Baldry - vocals
Andreas Schuld - guitar
Chris Nordquist - drums
John Lee Sanders - piano, keyboard, tuba
Norm Fraser - bass
Jesse Zubot - violin
Butch Coulter - harmonica
Tom Colclough - clarinet
Kathi McDonald - vocals
Papa John King - guitar
Al Webster - drums
Eric Webster - keyboard, piano
Johnny Ferreira - sax
Dave Babcock - sax
Rusty Reed - harp
Mike Lent - bass
Michelle Joseph - drums
Tom Lavin - guitar, tambourine, vocals
Teddy Borowiecki - piano
Bill Runge - bass
Darryl Bennett - drums, sax
Amos Garrett - guitar
Gaye Delmore - guitar
Mike Kalanj - hammond B3
Jimmy Witherspoon - vocals
Duke Robillard - guitar
Marty Ballou - bass
Marty Richards - drums
"Sax" Gordon Beadle - sax

Compiled by Holger Peterson
Produced by Tom Lavin, Miles Wilkinson, Duke Robillard, Andreas Schuld and Holger Peterson
Re-mastering by Miles Wilkinson
Art and design by Michael Dangelmaier, Karo Group, Calgary, AB.
Cover photo by Richard Siemens

2014 compilation albums
Long John Baldry albums
Stony Plain Records compilation albums